, more than 450 companies were listed on the Brazilian stock exchange B3, according to the exchange's website.

The following is a list of the components of B3's main index Ibovespa , their ticker symbol, industry, and the location of their headquarters.

Ibovespa

References

External links 
 Ibovespa (general information)

Bovespa
Ibovespa

de:IBOVESPA